Congenital cartilaginous rest of the neck is a minor and very rare congenital cutaneous condition characterized by branchial arch remnants that are considered to be the cervical variant of accessory tragus. It resembles a rudimentary pinna that in most cases is located in the lower anterior part of the neck.

See also 
 Congenital smooth muscle hamartoma
 List of cutaneous conditions

References 

Cutaneous congenital anomalies